Nadhir Hamada  is a Tunisian politician. He is the former Minister of Environment & Sustainable Development.

References

Government ministers of Tunisia
Living people
Year of birth missing (living people)